Poughkeepsie Day School is an independent, progressive, coeducational school in the mid-Hudson Valley serving students from a broad region of New York and Connecticut from pre-kindergarten through 12th grade.

History
Founded in 1934, it was originally located at Hooker and South Grand Avenues in the city of Poughkeepsie, where it began with 35 students and three faculty members. The school outgrew that facility, and in 1963 it moved to custom built premises on the Vassar College campus at 39 New Hackensack Road, Poughkeepsie. The school outgrew that facility as well, and acquired two buildings from IBM in the 1990s that form its current 35 acre campus on Boardman Road.

The theater is named for actor James Earl Jones, who funded construction and whose child attended the school. Pete Seeger, David Strathairn, Graham Parker, William Sadler and Jack DeJohnette also had children or grandchildren who attended the school.

In April 2020, the school announced that it would close in June after the completion of the current school year, due to financial concerns related to shrinking revenue. The announcement sparked an outpouring of support from alumni, parents, current and former teachers, and other committed stakeholders. A coalition of parents, teachers, and alumni came together to keep the school open and find a more sustainable path forward.

In February 2021, the school announced it would reopen for the 2021–22 school year with lower tuition and a smaller enrollment. The school did reopen its doors at Boardman Road in September 2021 and remains open as of November 2022. However a plan is also in place for the Town of Poughkeepsie to purchase the school's current property on Boardman Road.

School mission
According to its official website, "Poughkeepsie Day School creates transformative learning experiences that inspire intellectual curiosity, critical thinking, creativity, and compassion. We believe that education is a pathway to a more just society and sustainable planet. Through discovery, analysis, and reflection, our intentional learning community brings each child to a greater understanding of self, society, and the universe."

Accreditation
Poughkeepsie Day School is accredited by the New York State Association of Independent Schools (NYSAIS), and is a member of the National Association of Independent Schools (NAIS) and the Independent Curriculum Group (ICG).

Notable alumni and attendees

 Molly Baz
 Ivan Cash
 Celeste Dupuy-Spencer
 Douglas Elmendorf
 Tom Finkelpearl
 Lauren Holmes
 Jonathan Keltz
 Swati Khurana
 Lucy Knisley
 Gavrik Losey
 Noah Lyon
 Jeh Johnson
 Lee Miringoff, founder of the Marist College Institute for Public Opinion
 Molly Ostertag
 John R. Ross
 Jonathan Russell
 Jonah Sachs
 Ingeborg von Zadow

Notable faculty and staff 

 Sally Luther
 Eric Person

References

External links
 Official website
 About

1934 establishments in New York (state)
Education in Poughkeepsie, New York
Educational institutions established in 1934
Private elementary schools in New York (state)
Private high schools in Dutchess County, New York
Private middle schools in New York (state)